Daniel Aráoz (born September 14, 1979, in Tucumán, Argentina) is an Argentine footballer currently playing for Deportes La Serena of the Primera División in Chile.

Teams
 Atlético Tucumán 1997-2001
 El Porvenir 2002
 Deportivo Colonia 2003
 Atlético Tucumán 2003
 Estudiantes de Buenos Aires 2004
 Deportivo Español 2004-2005
 Talleres de Perico 2005-2006
 La Florida 2006-2007
 Talleres de Perico 2008
 Unión San Felipe 2008-2009
 Deportes La Serena 2010
 Gimnasia y Esgrima 2011-12
 Atlético Famailla 2012

Titles
 Atlético Tucumán 2003 Liga Tucumana de Fútbol
 Unión San Felipe 2009 Torneo Apertura Primera B Championship, Primera B and Copa Chile

References
 
 

1979 births
Living people
Argentine footballers
Argentine expatriate footballers
Atlético Tucumán footballers
Unión San Felipe footballers
Deportes La Serena footballers
Chilean Primera División players
Primera B de Chile players
Expatriate footballers in Chile
Expatriate footballers in Uruguay
Sportspeople from Tucumán Province
Talleres de Perico footballers
Association football midfielders